is a Japanese singer, songwriter, record producer, actress, model, spokesperson, and entrepreneur. By 2002, Hamasaki had earned the nickname "Empress of J-pop" due to her popularity in Japan and throughout Asia, as well as being referred to as "the voice of the lost generation". Due to her success and relevance throughout her career, she is considered one of the top solo female artists of the Heisei era for her influence on the music industry and various fashion trends.  

Born and raised in Fukuoka, Fukuoka Prefecture, Hamasaki moved to Tokyo at 14 in 1993 to pursue a career in singing and acting. In 1998, Hamasaki released her debut single "Poker Face" and debut major-label album A Song for ××. The album debuted at the top of the Oricon charts and remained there for five weeks, selling over a million copies. This rapid rise to fame is typically attributed to her insightful style of lyric-writing in contrast to her young age; this would continue to be a defining aspect of her work, listeners praising her poetic way of conveying relatable subjects. Her next ten albums shipped over a million copies in Japan, with her third, Duty, selling nearly three million. A Best, her first compilation album, further established her position as a crowning artist with more than four million copies sold in Japan. It was at this time that she represented more than 40% of her record label's income. 

After A Best, Hamasaki went on to experiment with her music style and lyricism, incorporating English into her work from Rainbow onwards. Later albums would range from electronic dream-pop to rock genres, with Hamasaki herself saying she does not feel tied to follow music trends, instead focusing on what she enjoys and wants to create "whether it is trendy or not". This perspective would continue to resonate with the public throughout her career, with her albums consistently placing in the top ten of the Oricon charts to present day; she currently holds the record for the most albums to place in the top ten by a female artist in Japan, with 54 of her releases reaching that distinction. 

Hamasaki has sold over 60.94 million units as of 2019, making her the best-selling Japanese solo artist in history. Hamasaki has several domestic record achievements for her singles, such as the most number-one hits by a female artist (38); the most consecutive number-one hits by a solo artist (25), and the most million-sellers. From 1999 to 2010, Hamasaki had at least two singles each year topping the charts. Hamasaki is also the first female recording artist to have ten studio albums since her debut to top the Oricon, and the first artist to have a number-one album for 13 consecutive years since her debut. In addition to this, Hamasaki's remix albums Super Eurobeat Presents Ayu-ro Mix and Ayu-mi-x II Version Non-Stop Mega Mix, are recognized as two of the best selling remix albums of all time worldwide.

Life and career

1978–1997: Childhood and early endeavors
Born in Fukuoka, Fukuoka Prefecture, Hamasaki was raised as an only child by her mother and grandmother. Her father had left the family when she was three and never again came into contact with her. Hamasaki's mother worked to support the family, so Hamasaki was primarily taken care of by her grandmother. She described herself as a "tomboy" when she was a teenager, and as a "strange kid" who "liked to be alone".

At age seven, Hamasaki began modeling for local institutions, such as banks, to supplement the family's income. She continued this career path by leaving her family at fourteen and moving to Tokyo as a model under SOS, a talent agency. Her modeling career did not last long; SOS eventually deemed her too short for a model and transferred her to Sun Music, a musicians' agency. Under the name of "Ayumi", Hamasaki released a rap EP, Nothing from Nothing, on the Nippon Columbia label in 1995. She was dismissed from the label when the album failed to chart on the Oricon. After this failure, Hamasaki took up acting and starred in B-movies such as Ladys Ladys!! Sōcho Saigo no Hi and television dramas such as Miseinen, which were poorly received by the public. From August 1995 to March 1996, Hamasaki also co-hosted the SoundLink "magazine" Hōkago no Ōsama (After-school King) for the Nintendo Satellaview once a week with Shigeru Izumiya. Growing dissatisfied with her job, Hamasaki quit acting and moved in with her mother, who had recently moved to Tokyo.

Hamasaki initially earned good grades in junior high school. Eventually, she lost faith in the curriculum, thinking that the subjects were of no use to her. Her grades worsened as she refused to put her mind to her studies. While living in Tokyo, she attempted to further her studies at Horikoshi Gakuen, a high school for the arts, but dropped out in the first year. Hamasaki did not attend school or have a job, so she spent much of her time shopping at Shibuya boutiques and dancing at Velfarre, an Avex-owned disco club.

At Velfarre, she was introduced to her future producer Max Matsuura through a friend. After hearing Hamasaki sing karaoke, Matsuura offered her a recording deal, but Hamasaki suspected ulterior motives and turned the offer down. He persisted and succeeded in recruiting her for the Avex label in the following year. Hamasaki started vocal training but skipped most of her classes after finding her instructors too rigid and the classes dull. When she mentioned this to Matsuura, he sent her to New York to train her vocals under another method. While abroad, Hamasaki frequently corresponded with Matsuura and impressed him with her style of writing. On her return to Japan, he suggested that she try writing her own lyrics.

1998–1999: Musical beginnings, A Song for xx, and Loveppears
Hamasaki made her debut under Avex at 19 on April 8, 1998, with the single "Poker Face". It—and the following four singles—were not major hits; however, each release was better than the last, thus gradually increasing her exposure and presence on the market. Hamasaki's debut album, A Song for ×× (released on January 1, 1999), was "unassuming": the tracks, composed by Yasuhiko Hoshino, Akio Togashi (of Da Pump), and Mitsuru Igarashi (of Every Little Thing), were "cautious" pop-rock songs. However, Hamasaki's lyrics, introspective observations about her feelings and experiences that focused on loneliness and individualism, resonated with the Japanese public. The songs gained Hamasaki a growing following, and the release of the album was a success: it topped the Oricon charts for five weeks and sold over a million copies. For her achievements, she earned a Japan Gold Disc Award for "Best New Artist of the Year".

With Ayu-mi-x (March 1999), the first of a series of remix albums, Hamasaki began moving beyond the pop-rock of A Song for ×× and began to incorporate different styles including trance, dance, and orchestra. Hamasaki began to experiment with different musical styles in her singles as well, releasing dance tunes and ballads as well as remixes on the singles which spanned reggae and house. The singles were milestones: Hamasaki earned her first number-one single ("Love: Destiny") and first million-selling single ("A"). Her second studio album, Loveppears (November 1999), not only topped the Oricon charts, it sold nearly 3 million copies. The album also showcased a change in Hamasaki's lyrics. Though the lyrics of Loveppears still dealt with loneliness, many of them were written from a third-person perspective. In support of Loveppears, she held her first tour, Ayumi Hamasaki Concert Tour 2000 A.

A Film for XX is the first video clip collection by Ayumi Hamasaki, it was released on September 15, 1999.

2000–2002: Duty, A Best, I Am..., and Rainbow
From April to June 2000, Hamasaki released the "Trilogy", a series of singles consisting of "Vogue", "Far Away", and "Seasons". The lyrics of these songs focused on hopelessness, a reflection of Hamasaki's disappointment that she had not expressed herself thoroughly in any of her previous lyrics and a sense of shame of her public image. Likewise, many of the songs she wrote for her subsequent studio album, Duty (September 2000), involved feelings of loneliness, chaos, confusion, and the burden of her responsibilities. She described her feelings after the writing as "unnatural" and "nervous". The musical style was darker as well; in contrast with Loveppears, Duty was a rock-influenced album with only one dance song, "Audience". Duty resonated with fans: the "Trilogy" were "hit singles" ("Seasons" was a million-seller), and the album became Hamasaki's best-selling studio album. At the end of 2000, Hamasaki held her first New Year countdown concert at the Yoyogi National Gymnasium.

In 2001, Avex forced Hamasaki to release her first compilation album, A Best, on March 28, putting the album in "competition" with Hikaru Utada's second studio album, Distance. The "competition" between the two singers (which both claimed was merely a creation of their record companies and the media) was supposedly the reason for the success of the albums; both sold over 5 million copies. In support of Duty and A Best, Hamasaki held a tour of Japan's domes, making her one of few "top-drawer" Japanese artists to hold a concert at the Tokyo Dome.

I Am... (January 2002) marked several milestones for Hamasaki. Hamasaki increased her control over her music by composing all of the songs on the album under the pseudonym "Crea", of which the 2000 single "M" was the first. "Connected" (November 2002) and "A Song Is Born" (December 2001) were the exceptions. I Am... also showed evolution in Hamasaki's lyrical style: it was a retreat from the themes of "loneliness and confusion" of some of her earlier songs. Moved by the September 11 attacks, Hamasaki revised her vision of I Am..., focusing on issues such as faith and world peace. "A Song Is Born", in particular, was directly influenced by the events. The single, a duet with Keiko Yamada, was released as part of Avex's non-profit Song Nation project, which raised money for charity. She also dropped the planned cover and opted instead to be portrayed as a "peace muse", explaining, 

The outlook inspired by the September 11 attacks extended beyond I Am.... In 2002, Hamasaki held her first concert outside Japan, at the MTV Asia music awards ceremony in Singapore, a move interpreted as the beginning of a campaign prompted by a sluggish Japanese market. At the ceremony, she received the award for "Most Influential Japanese Singer in Asia". In support of I Am..., Hamasaki held two tours, Ayumi Hamasaki Arena Tour 2002 A and Ayumi Hamasaki Stadium Tour 2002 A. In November 2002, as "Ayu", she released her first European single, "Connected", a trance song from I Am... composed by DJ Ferry Corsten. It was released in Germany on the Drizzly label. Hamasaki continued to release singles (all of them remixes of previously released songs) in Germany on Drizzly until 2005.

In April 2002, Hamasaki released the single "Free & Easy". In collaboration with the magazine Free&Easy, Hamasaki also released Hamasaki Republic, a photobook that was actually a special issue of Free&Easy, in conjunction with the single. "H", Hamasaki's next single, became the best-selling single of 2002. Hamasaki released her last single of 2002, "Voyage", on September 26. In lieu of a regular-length music video, the short film Tsuki ni Shizumu, starring Hamasaki, was created for "Voyage" and was released at a select theater in Shibuya. Hamasaki's next studio album, Rainbow (December 2002) was her first to use English lyrics. After performing at the 2002 MTV Asia music awards, Hamasaki felt that by writing only Japanese lyrics, she was not able to bring her "message" to other countries. Realizing that English was a "common global language", she included English lyrics in three songs. The album was stylistically diverse; Hamasaki included rock- and trip hop-influenced tracks as well as "summery", "up-tempo" and "grand gothic" songs and experimented with new techniques such as gospel choruses and the yells of an audience. The lyrics were also varied: themes in the album included freedom, the struggles of women, and "a summer that ends in sadness".

2003–2006: My Story, (Miss)Understood, and Secret
In 2003, Hamasaki released three singles, "&", "Forgiveness", and "No Way to Say". To celebrate the release of her thirtieth single ("Forgiveness"), Hamasaki held the A Museum concert at the Yoyogi National Gymnasium. Her mini-album Memorial Address (December 2003) was her first album to be released in CD+DVD format in addition to the regular CD-only format, a decision that came from her increased interest in the direction of her music videos. Like her previous albums, Memorial Address topped the Oricon chart and sold over a million copies. Sales of Hamasaki's singles began to wane. Although all three of the album's singles topped the Oricon charts, "&" was Hamasaki's last single to sell over 500,000 copies.

By the end of her Arena Tour 2003–2004, Hamasaki had grown dissatisfied with her position in Avex: she felt that the company was treating her as a product instead of a person. Along with her dissatisfaction over her last two studio albums (which she thought had been rushed), this led her to begin work on My Story (December 2004) early. In contrast with her previous albums, My Story had no set theme, nor did Hamasaki attempt to write "something good" or even "something that would give people hope"; rather, she simply wrote freely and honestly. As a result, the album contained mostly autobiographical lyrics about her emotions and reminiscences of her career. She approached the composition of the music with the same freedom as the lyrics, with the album's notable rock overtones expressing her liking for rock music. She was so pleased with the result that she declared My Story the first album she felt satisfied with. My Story and its singles, "Moments", "Inspire", and "Carols", all topped the weekly Oricon charts; moreover, with sales of over 1,100,000 units, My Story became Hamasaki's last million-selling studio album according to Oricon. From January to April 2005, Hamasaki held the nationwide My Story arena tour, her first album-based tour. Also in January, she began working with Lamoureux Orchestra to create My Story Classical, a classical version of My Story; the album served as an "alter-ego" of the mostly aggressive My Story. The orchestra also created a classical version of "A Song Is Born", which was included on My Story Classical and which Hamasaki performed at the opening of the Expo 2005.

(Miss)understood (January 2006), Hamasaki's seventh studio album, showed new musical directions. Wanting to sing a tune like those of the group Sweetbox, Hamasaki obtained the permission of Sweetbox composer Roberto "Geo" Rosan to use demo songs he had intended to use in Sweetbox's upcoming album. She edited the songs to fit her personal vision, rewriting the lyrics and rearranging some of the songs. The result was more musically diverse than the previous album; (Miss)understood included ballads, funk, dance-pop, R&B, and rock songs. All of (Miss)understood singles reached the top of the Oricon; "Bold & Delicious" became Hamasaki's twenty-fifth number-one single, tying her with Seiko Matsuda for the record of most number-one singles by a solo female artist. Though (Miss)understood also reached the top of the charts, Oricon stated that it sold fewer than a million copies—Hamasaki's first studio album to do so. In support of the album, Hamasaki held the (Miss)understood arena tour, which spanned three months with thirty concerts, from Saitama on March 11, 2006, to Yoyogi on June 11, 2006.

Hamasaki's first single of 2006, "Startin'", became Hamasaki's twenty-sixth number-one single, setting a new record for most number-one singles held by a solo female artist. The subsequent studio album, Secret, was released in November 2006. "Secrets" was, appropriately, the theme of the album; the album also explored strong female figures, love, and sadness; songs depicted the artist's struggles and were written to encourage women. Although Secret was originally intended to be a mini-album, Hamasaki "began brimming with things to say" while producing the album and wrote five more songs. The album consisted mostly of rock songs and ballads; to complement these, Hamasaki experimented with new vocal techniques. The album also topped the Oricon weekly charts, making Hamasaki the only artist to have eight consecutive number-one studio albums.

2007–2008: A Best 2, Guilty, and A Complete
On February 28, 2007, Hamasaki released A Best 2, a pair of compilation albums containing songs from I Am... to (Miss)understood. The two versions, White and Black, debuted at the first and second positions on the Oricon weekly charts, making Hamasaki the first female artist in 36 years to hold the top two positions on any Oricon album chart. At the end of 2007, the pair became Japan's fifth and seventh best-selling albums of the year respectively. In support of A Best 2 and Secret, Hamasaki held the four-month-long Tour of Secret from March to the end of June. Her foreign fanbase highly anticipated the concerts, and tickets for the Taipei and Hong Kong performances sold out in less than three hours.

In July 2007, Hamasaki released her first single in over a year, "Glitter/Fated". A short film, Distance Love, was used as the music video for "Glitter" and "Fated". The film, shot in Hong Kong, co-starred Hong Kong actor Shawn Yue as Hamasaki's romantic interest. "Glitter/Fated" and the following single "Talkin' 2 Myself" reached the top of their respective charts, continuing Hamasaki's streak of number-one singles. In December, Hamasaki released her first digital-only single, "Together When...", which topped the RIAJ's monthly download chart. Unlike its predecessors, the writing of Hamasaki's ninth studio album, Guilty (January 2008), was not an emotional experience for her, nor did it have a set theme. However, she said later that the album's tracks appeared to tell a story. Most of the songs were dark; the album had a notable rock tinge. It contained some upbeat dance tracks and ballads, though the latter also had rock overtones. Guilty peaked at the number-two position on the weekly Oricon charts, making it Hamasaki's first studio album not to reach the top and ended Hamasaki's streak of eight consecutive number-one albums. Guilty was later released as a digital album in 26 countries outside Japan, 19 of them Western nations. That, along with Hamasaki's decision to employ western DJs such as The Young Punx, Coldcut, Para One and Armand Van Helden for her 2008 remix albums Ayu-mi-x 6: Gold and Ayu-mi-x 6: Silver, has been interpreted as her first major step into the global market.

In April 2008, to commemorate her tenth anniversary in Avex, Hamasaki released the single "Mirrorcle World"; it topped the Oricon, making Hamasaki the only female solo artist to have a number-one single every year for ten consecutive years. Hamasaki also held her second tour of Asia, Asia Tour 2008: 10th Anniversary, to celebrate her tenth anniversary. From April until June, she toured Japan, holding seventeen concerts. On September 10, 2008, Hamasaki released A Complete: All Singles, a compilation album that includes the A-sides of all her singles along with previously unreleased footage from her A-nation concerts, which became the 8th best selling album of 2008.

2009–2011: Next Level, Rock 'n' Roll Circus, Love Songs, and Five
Hamasaki's next two singles, "Days/Green" (December 2008) and "Rule/Sparkle" (February 2009), continued Hamasaki's streak of number-one singles. "Rule" is used as the international theme song for the film Dragonball Evolution. The subsequent studio album, Next Level, was released on March 25, 2009, in several formats: CD, CD+DVD, 2CD+DVD and a two-gigabyte USB flash drive. Sonically, Next Level was mainly an electronic dance album. Next Level reached the top of the Oricon charts, making Hamasaki the only artist to have a number-one album every year for eleven years in a row since her debut. However, the album was only certified double platinum, making it Hamasaki's lowest-selling studio album to that date. 

On August 12, 2009, Hamasaki released her 46th single, "Sunrise/Sunset (Love Is All)". "Sunrise (Love Is All)", one of the A-sides, is being used as the opening theme song for the Japanese television drama Dandy Daddy?. The single reached the top of the weekly charts, making it her 21st consecutive (33rd total) number-one single. "Sunrise/Sunset" is also her 44th single to enter the Top 10, making Hamasaki the artist with the most Top 10 singles ever. Hamasaki's third single of the year, "You Were.../Ballad", was released on December 29, 2009. 

Hamasaki's eleventh studio album Rock 'n' Roll Circus was released on April 14, 2010. Though the album contained a few "powerful and melodramatic gothic rock" tracks, it was mainly "pure and classic J-pop", with pop-rock songs and ballads. The album topped the charts, making Hamasaki the first female solo artist in twenty years to have ten number-one original studio albums. Hamasaki also began expanding her online presence, setting up accounts on MySpace, Ustream, and Twitter. In July, entertainment company Livespire announced that Hamasaki's 2009 Next Level tour would be shown in 3D at Toho cinemas nationwide beginning on August 28.

On July 14, Hamasaki released her forty-eighth single, "Moon/Blossom". The single was released as the first of a three-part project to celebrate her yet-unreleased fiftieth single. The two other singles in the project (her forty-ninth and fiftieth singles respectively), "Crossroad" and "L", were released within a week of each other, "Crossroad" on September 22 and "L" on September 29. "Crossroad" was composed by Tetsuya Komuro and its coupling was her cover version of Komuro's band TM Network's 1988 song "Seven Days War", which was her first cover of a male song. The three singles all topped the Oricon, becoming Hamasaki's twenty-third, twenty-fourth and twenty-fifth consecutive number-one singles and setting a new record for the most consecutive number-one singles by any female artist (solo or group) as well as by any solo artist. 

On December 22, Hamasaki released her twelfth original studio album, Love Songs. On the same day, Naoya Urata of AAA released his debut solo single "Dream On". The song, which featured Hamasaki, was written and produced by her, marking the first record she produced for another singer. Love Songs and "Dream On" both reached the top spots on their respective Oricon charts. Love Songs became Hamasaki's fourth consecutive and seventeenth total number-one album. The album also marked Hamasaki's thirteenth consecutive year with a number-one album, breaking her previous record.

In February 2011, it was announced that her arena tour of the year, Hotel Love Songs, would start in April. Shortly after the 2011 Tohoku earthquake and tsunami hit, it was announced that the tour was rescheduled to start in late May, and the tour was renamed to Power of Music. Deeply affected by the Tohoku earthquake and tsunami devastation, Hamasaki decided to collaborate with fashion magazine, Vivi, with the sale of charity shirts and the profits going to help the victims in the devastation. 

On April 20, 2011, Hamasaki simultaneously released four new remix albums, Ayu-mi-x 7:House, Acoustic Orchestra, Trance 4, Ayu-ro Mix 4, and a Limited Complete Box Set, which were also released internationally on iTunes. On that same day, Hamasaki also released 2010 Rock 'n' Roll Circus Tour and A 50 Singles: Live Selection which topped the weekly chart at No. 1 and No. 2 respectively. The simultaneous releases made Hamasaki the first artist ever to have 4 albums in Oricon's top 10 and also the first artist to hold 2 top positions in the Oricon DVD chart. Their original release date of March 30 was postponed due to the 2011 Tohoku earthquake and tsunami and was pushed back to April 20 instead. On April 21, 2011, it was announced that she would perform in a-nation 10th Anniversary for Life Charge & Go! On May 4, it was announced that she broke another record – the female artist with the highest DVD sales with 2,313,000.

On August 31, Hamasaki released her second mini album Five, her first since Memorial Address in 2003. This was her first album to have no singles released. Five topped the Oricon Charts for 2 consecutive weeks, her first to do so since (Miss)understood. The lead song, "Progress", was used as a theme song for the videogame, Tales of Xillia. The album also featured collaborations with singers Juno and Naoya Urata from AAA. 

This album managed to be certified Gold by RIAJ, making Hamasaki's first album not to be certified Platinum. Complete Clip Box 1998–2011, consisting all her music videos from her first single, "Poker Face" until her latest mini-album, Five, was released on January 1, 2012. "How Beautiful You Are" was later released as the theme song for a drama Saigo Kara Nibanme no Koi, and also Hamasaki's second digital single (55th single overall) on February 8. Hamasaki described the song as a mid-tempo ballad, containing "feelings of gratitude towards another person".

2012–2013: 15th anniversary, Party Queen, Love Again, and A Summer Best
In 2012, The International 3D Society announced the winners of its 2012 3D Creative Arts Awards with Hamasaki receiving an award for "Electronic Broadcast Media (Television) – Live Event" for her A3D Ayumi Hamasaki Arena Tour 2009 A: Next Level tour.On March 21, Hamasaki released her thirteenth studio album, Party Queen, which was recorded entirely in London. Its title track is inspired by the British slang of being a 'party queen' - someone who is partying hard and looks to be doing well, but is emotionally self-destructing. The album peaked at number two on the Oricon charts, becoming her second studio album to do so after 2008's Guilty. The album spanned themes of grief, isolation, addiction, and regret, with the singer using upbeat dance beats on key tracks to represent the contrast of fame, glitz, and glamor with personal inner turmoil; she would later comment that the album cover includes callbacks to her previous work, Duty, as if "(she) never succeeded in leaving the cage" originally depicted on the latter's own album art. During the press tour for Party Queen, Hamasaki would say that songwriting had been so easy for her during this era, that at one point she had considered making the release her first double album. 

On August 6, 2012, Hamasaki released her sixth compilation album A Summer Best. It included two new songs which were digitally released for the promotion of the album: the TRF cover, Happening Here, and You & Me.

In September 2012, it was announced that, to commemorate Hamasaki's 15th anniversary in the music industry on April 8, 2013, she would be releasing new material for five consecutive months starting on the 8th day of November, 2012, until the 8th of March, 2013. The first releases were two mini albums, Love and Again, which were put on sale on the 8th of November and December, respectively. The third release for the 8th of January was her compilation album A Classical, which included classical arrangements of previously released songs. The fourth release was Hamasaki's 14th studio album, Love Again, which compiled the songs included in the two previous mini albums and debuted atop the weekly Oricon Albums Chart. The fifth and final release was the DVD/Blu-ray of her Arena Tour 2012 A: Hotel Love Songs, released in March. 

In April 2013 Hamasaki began her 15th Anniversary Tour: A Best Live, which lasted for four months until the end of July. Its setlist was chosen by fans through online voting, and was later released as her first live album CD on September 18. The DVD and Blu-ray versions were released on October 30, 2013. 

On December 25, 2013, Hamasaki released "Feel the Love/Merry-go-round", her first physical single in three years. "Feel the Love" was composed by Tetsuya Komuro and produced by Dj Hello Kitty, while "Merry-go-round" was produced by M-Flo's Taku Takahashi and features rapper Verbal. Both songs are heavily influenced by Western dance-pop music.

2014–2015: Colours, A One, and Sixxxxxx
In January 2014, it was announced that a new song entitled "Pray" was chosen to be the theme song for the anime film Osamu Tezuka's Budda 2—Owarinaki Tabi, which premiered on February 8, 2014, in Japan. The song was released digitally on January 27, 2014. Another new song, entitled "Hello New Me", was presented as theme song for a new season of Fuji TV drama Zoku—Saigo Kara Nibanme no Koi. which started broadcasting in April, 2014. The song was released digitally on May 14, 2014. From May 30 to July 6, 2014, Hamasaki held her Premium Showcase: Feel the Love tour, on which she offered 11 concerts at 3 locations: Nagoya, Osaka and Tokyo. On this tour, Hamasaki abandoned for the first time the traditional format of her previous concerts and presented an uninterrupted, shorter show, on which she also debuted as an aerial acrobat. 

Hamasaki's fifteenth studio album, entitled Colours, was released on July 2, 2014. The album featured internationally renowned producers, such as RedOne, Rodney Jerkins, Armin van Buuren and Fedde le Grand, making the first time in Hamasaki's career in which primarily Western producers were appointed to produce one of her studio albums. Colours peaked at number five on its first week on the Oricon charts, becoming Hamasaki's first studio album to debut out of the Top 3. However, it also marked a new record for her, as with this achievement she became the second artist in Japan's history—after Yumi Matsutoya—to have 47 albums within the Top 10 of the charts. 

In September 2014, Hamasaki released two recut singles from Colours: "Terminal" and "XOXO" on the PlugAir platform. The single was released under Linkin Park's Machine Shop Records for the American release.

On October 18, 2014, Hamasaki performed as the closing act in the A-Nation premium concert held at the Marina Bay Sands' MasterCard Theatres in Singapore. This was the second time performing in Singapore after her MTV Asia Awards performance 12 years ago. 

On November 2, 2014, Hamasaki announced through her official Facebook page that she had started recording new material composed by Tetsuya Komuro, Kunio Tago and Tetsuya Yukumi for a "winter ballad trilogy" single. On November 6, 2014, the title of the single was revealed to be "Zutto.../Last Minute/Walk", and its release date was set for December 24, 2014. It would later peak at number five on the Oricon charts. With this achievement, Hamasaki became the first solo artist in Japan's history to have 50 singles within the Top 10 of the Oricon charts. As for artists in general, Hamasaki became the third artist with more Top ten singles since Oricon's foundation in 1968—being surpassed by groups Morning Musume and SMAP, with 57 and 53 Top ten singles respectively 

On November 10, 2014, it was announced that Hamasaki would be collaborating in a tribute cover album for Hikaru Utada, entitled Utada Hikaru no Uta, to be released on December 9, 2014. For the album she contributed with a cover of Utada's 1998 single "Movin' on Without You", which was arranged by the RedOne production team. This was reportedly the track Hamasaki insisted she cover, with her later stating that it was the first song she had in mind since being told of the project. 

In December 2014 Hamasaki announced that she would be not attending the New Year show Kōhaku Uta Gassen for the first time in 15 years. She explained her decision stating that she wanted to lower her responsibilities and things she felt pressured to do, in order to focus on the projects she had for her career, mainly regarding her plans to expand her influence throughout Asia.

On February 15, 2015, Hamasaki made a surprise guest appearance during Singaporean singer JJ Lin's concert in Taipei, Taiwan. They performed a duet version of Hamasaki's 2000 single "Seasons", and announced that JJ Lin would be producing a song for Hamasaki's next studio album, A One. A One was released on April 8, 2015, including singles "Zutto...", "Last Minute", "Walk", Utada's cover "Movin' on Without You", and JJ Lin-produced song "The Gift", for which a promotional music video was also made. 

Between April and July 2015, Hamasaki embarked on her Arena Tour 2015 A: Cirque de Minuit tour throughout Japan, which was planned as an expanded version of her previous Countdown Live concerts held in late 2014. The tour consisted of a 34-song setlist show with a duration of 3 hours and 45 minutes, her longest concert held to date. At the final show of the aforementioned tour, Hamasaki announced that she would start another tour in September, this time exclusively for members of her official fan club, TeamAyu. The TA Limited Live Tour, Hamasaki's first fan club exclusive tour in twelve years after 2003, began on September 29, 2015, and included a total of 16 concerts at 7 venues.

In April 2015, a new song entitled "Step by Step" began to be broadcast as the theme song of NHK TV drama Bijo to Danshi, and was subsequently released as a digital single on July 1. It became the lead single for the later released Sixxxxxx on August 5, 2015. The mini album featured six new songs, including drama theme song "Step by Step", and "Sayonara", a new song featuring Taiwanese boyband SpeXial. "Sayonara" became #1 on digital downloads charts in Taiwan, Hong Kong, Singapore and Malaysia, according to KK BOX, Asia's largest digital distribution site. 

In addition, Hamasaki participated as one of the headliners of the A-Nation Stadium Fes 2015 held on August 30 at the Ajinomoto Stadium, where she also performed a cover of Globe's hit ballad song "Departures". Later in this same year, Hamasaki recorded a cover of Globe's "Many Classic Moments", which was included in the group's tribute album released on December 16, 2015. 

On December 23, 2015, Hamasaki released a winter-themed concept album entitled Winter Diary: A7 Classical, which included songs from her previous two albums A One and Sixxxxxx remixed with Classical arrangements, and one new song "Winter Diary", which was produced by Tetsuya Komuro. Hamasaki promoted the album by starting an Instagram account, that originally was stated to only be open until the end of January 2016. She shared pictures of the music video shooting of "Winter Diary" recorded in Taiwan, and also the preparations for her 2015–2016 countdown live concerts.

In December 2015, Hamasaki also contributed with the lyrics of "Diary", using her past composer name of Crea, to the debut single of Micchie. Micchie's single was released on December 23, 2015, through Nippon Crown.

2016–2017: Made in Japan
Hamasaki confirmed that she had been working on her seventeenth studio album for 2016 through a post published on Instagram. A 15th anniversary edition of Hamasaki's 2001 greatest hits album A Best was released on March 28, 2016. In May 2016, Hamasaki started her nationwide tour Arena Tour 2016 A: Made in Japan, which was expanded version of her 2015–2016 Countdown Live Made in Tokyo. On May 11, Hamasaki made a surprise release of her 17th studio album, entitled Made in Japan, through music streaming website AWA, where it reached 1 million legal streams five days after release. The album was released on physical formats on June 29, 2016. With the album peaking at number two on the weekly Oricon chart, Hamasaki became the solo-artist with the most top-ten albums (50).

On September 30, 2016, Hamasaki released the digital single "We Are the Queens", which was used as a theme song of smartphone game Clash of Queens developed by Elex Wireless. Hamasaki herself starred in the TV commercial for the game, which was first broadcast on September 17.

On September 6, 2017, Hamasaki released a new song entitled "Words" as a free download for attenders to her Just the Beginning: Sacrifice tour, available until November 30 through the mu-mo website.

During 2017 Hamasaki embarked on her Just the Beginning -20- Tour 2017, whose first leg started on May 13, 2017, at Yokohama Arena through July 17 at the Osaka-jō Hall, Osaka. The second leg of the tour, entitled Just the beginning Part 2: Sacrifice, commenced on September 6 at the Pacifico Yokohama National Convention Hall, Yokohama, and is scheduled to end on November 28 at the Shunanshi Bunka Hall, Yamaguchi. A third leg of the tour began on December 2, 2017, at the Wakayama Prefectural Cultural Hall, through February 20, 2018, at the Okinawa Convention Center.

2018–2020: 20th anniversary, Trouble, M Aisubeki Hito ga Ite 
Hamasaki embarked on the Power of Music 20th Anniversary arena tour from April 7 to July 22, 2018. She announced her then upcoming seventh extended play, Trouble—released on August 15, 2018—on the final day of the tour. 

In August 2019, popular non-fiction author Narumi Komatsu released a novel about Hamasaki entitled M Aisubeki Hito ga Ite, in which it was revealed that the singer had been in a relationship with her producer, Max Matsuura, in the early days of her debut. The book was written based on interviews with Hamasaki herself and gives a rare insight in the artist's private life and her road to stardom, although before the book was published, the singer stated that the book "combined both fact and fiction" to make its own story. Hamasaki also wrote a foreword to the novel, which was set in present time as she prepared for her 20th anniversary, and of her thoughts working with Matsuura again after the two grew apart professionally earlier in the 2010s. The book instantly became a best-seller, and reached #1 in the charts. A television drama-series based on the novel aired from April to July 2020. A 20th anniversary edition of Hamasaki's 1999 album Loveppears, was released on November 10, 2019. On December 30 and 31, Hamasaki held her annual New Year's Eve concerts, with the latter date recorded and later released as Countdown Live 2019–2020: Promised Land.

On February 20, the singer began Trouble Tour 2020: Saigo no Trouble. The tour was suspended after only two dates due to COVID-19 pandemic restrictions imposed by the Japanese government. On May 19, Hamasaki announced the cancellation of the remaining 36 dates through her official website.

On July 4, a surprise TV-commercial featuring a new song by the singer, titled "Ohia no Ki", was broadcast after the airing of the final episode of M Aisubeki Hito ga Ite. Hamasaki's first new song in two years, it was also her first to have a title in Japanese instead of English. The song was composed by Kazuhito Kikuchi—known for having composed some of Hamasaki's signature songs, such as "Who..." and "Heaven"—with lyrics inspired by her newborn son. "Ohia no Ki" was released on digital platforms in Japan the next day. 

The singer held her Premium Limited Live A: Natsu no Trouble special concert without an in-person audience on July 25; it was streamed live on AbemaTV. A new digital single, "Dreamed a Dream", followed at the end of that month. 

On August 29, Hamasaki took part in A-Nation Online 2020 - the first time Avex had streamed their annual summer festival. 

Due to the cancellation of her 2020 tour, Hamasaki held an online concert named Trouble Tour 2020 A: Saigo no Trouble - Final on October 2. This was without an in-person audience, the stream being hosted by Mu-mo Live. On December 2, the singer also performed "Ohia no Ki" as part of the FNS Music Festival. Later that same month, Hamasaki planned to hold an in-person Christmas concert titled Special Showcase Xmas Eve 2020, but it was later adapted to be a streaming exclusive via YouTube on December 24. Countdown Live 2020-2021 A: Music For Life, two New Year concerts for December 30 and 31, were cancelled on December 29 due to a member of staff testing positive with COVID-19. Hamasaki later confirmed she was following isolation instructions and had not tested positive herself.

2021–2022: A Ballads 2 
Hamasaki released the compilation album A Ballads 2 on April 8, 2021, which included remastered versions of 29 previously released songs, as well as the single "Ohia no Ki" and a new cover of Yumi Matsutoya's "Haru yo, Koi".  Alongside A Ballads 2, she released the digital single "23rd Monster" on April 8. In the track, Hamasaki covers the themes of public pressure, self-doubt, and retaking control of one's own life; the title in reference to it being released on the date of her own 23rd anniversary since her major label debut. 

On June 26 2021 Hamasaki held an online concert titled Music for Life: Return, hosted on Mu-mo Live as well as having an in-person audience, which reused the concept and parts of the setlist she had planned for the cancelled Countdown Live 2020 - 2021 A: Music For Life.  An in-person exclusive concert, Summer TA Party 2021, was held on August 23 at the Team Smile Toyosu Pit venue. After the concert ended, Hamasaki announced a new tour named Asia Tour 2021-2022 A: 23rd Monster; despite the name, there were no confirmed dates outside of Japan due to COVID-19 restrictions. The tour began on October 2 at the Makuhari Event Hall, Chiba. On August 28, Hamasaki performed "23rd Monster" on FNS Laugh & Music. On October 18, the singer appeared as a guest producer on 17LIVE 4th Anniversary meets Ayumi Hamasaki, judging auditioning artists alongside her own long-time collaborator, Yuta Nakano. The winner of the program would then work with both Hamasaki and Nakano for their own debut track. Later that year, Hamasaki performed both "Haru yo, koi" and "No way to say" on the FNS Music Festival program, December 1. At the end of the year, her Countdown Live 2021 - 2022 A: 23rd Monster concerts were held with an in-person audience, along with it being streamed online by dTV.   

In 2022, digital single "Nonfiction" was released on April 22, its lyrics condemning the recent uptick in false news reports and conspiracies. It was first revealed at Hamasaki's Asia Tour: 24th Anniversary Special concert, held at PIA Arena MM on April 6 and streamed through dTV; the concert also had Kishidan as special guests, who performed her cover of their hit One Night Carnival with the singer. Atsuo Nagahori of The First Times reviewed the concert, concluding "She continues to evolve and challenge herself as an artist, and there are more people than ever drawn to keep their eyes on her", citing her performances of "A Song For ××" , "Poker Face", and "Nonfiction" as highlights. After the concert had ended, Hamasaki commented on her feelings entering her 24th anniversary year, stating "I hope everyone who has been on this journey, whether they know me as Ayu or Ayumi Hamasaki, will think 'I'm glad I had this person in my life', even if just for a moment." 

"Summer Again" was released on July 1, which had callbacks to previous summer single "Inspire" in its music video, shot on Ishigaki Island. From July to August, seven Summer TA Party 2022 concerts were held across Tokyo, Osaka, and Fukuoka. On September 11, the singer performed "Nonfiction" on FNS Laugh & Music, along with appearing in a comedy skit and talk section. Her third digital single of 2022, "Mask", was released on November 18, with its later released music video made in collaboration with TeamLabs.  

Hamasaki took part in the annual FNS Music Festival on December 7, performing "appears" and "Who...". The final show for Asia Tour 2021-2022 A: 23rd Monster took place on December 10, 2022 in Nagoya. On December 28, the singer performed "Blue Bird" and "Nonfiction" at the NTV Music Awards, announcing after the show that "(Not) Remember You" will be a pre-release album track, available from January 1 2023.     

Countdown Live 2022–2023: Remember You, Hamasaki's New Year's Eve concert, was held on December 30 and 31 at Yoyogi National Stadium.  The final date on December 31 was also streamed on dTV.

2023: 25th anniversary, Remember you 
A new album, Remember You, was released on January 25. Its final confirmed tracklist consisted of 14 songs, which includes the seven singles released over the last two years. To commemorate its release, Hamasaki hosted a YouTube Q&A livestream for the first time on January 24; during the livestream, she answered questions ranging from her Asia Tour to her current make-up, responding to both Japanese and international fans over an hour-long period.

Artistry

Lyrics 

Hamasaki's lyrics have resonated among her fans throughout her career, who praise them as being honest and heartfelt and "expressing determination"; in two surveys conducted by Oricon, respondents voted Hamasaki's lyrics as their favorite aspect of her artistry. Steve McClure of The Japan Times noted that Hamasaki has "developed a reputation as a thoughtful, introspective lyricist"; Barry Walters of The Village Voice comments that Hamasaki's lyrics "pack unlikely insights". Having "trouble voicing her thoughts", Hamasaki uses her lyrics as an outlet; she draws inspiration from her own (and occasionally her friends') experiences and emotions and tries to put them "honestly into words". She has stated that honesty is essential to her lyrics, saying, "If I write when I'm low, it will be a dark song, but I don't care. I want to be honest with myself at all times." This meant that she did not use English lyrics until her album Rainbow, as she felt that she could best express herself in Japanese. As with her musical style, the themes of her lyrics have varied. Her debut album A Song for ×× dealt mostly with themes of "loneliness and confusion", as did her second album Loveppears. Duty likewise expressed feelings of disappointment and confusion. Hamasaki began to take on a more global outlook with her following albums I Am... and Rainbow, branching out to wider themes such as faith and peace. Music critic Tetsu Misaki noted a large change in her lyrics style between her debut album A Song for ×× (1999), which mostly dealt with personal problems, and her following albums Loveppears and Duty. Misaki believed Hamasaki had begun thinking about her influence on society more, and began writing songs with important messages she wanted to express to her listeners. This was signalled by her not using first person pronouns as much, and instead using the words  and  more often. As Hamasaki matured, her lyrics began to express more confidence; themes in her later albums included love and the struggles of women. With Guilty, Hamasaki began to compose her lyrics not only as an exposition of her personal feelings but as encouragements for her listeners, an outlook she applied in Next Level as well. In songs such as "Talkin' 2 Myself" and "Mirrorcle World", Hamasaki deals with the "awareness and fighting spirit of surviving in a high-risk age" to encourage listeners. In addition to personal experiences and feelings, Hamasaki bases lyrics on sources such as historical events. The life of Joan of Arc was the inspiration for "Free & Easy", a story told to her by her friend about a saint named Mary served as the basis for "M", and the September 11 attacks inspired "A Song Is Born".

Musical style 
In addition to writing her own lyrics, Hamasaki has also involved herself in other aspects of production such as artistic direction. Though Max Matsuura is officially credited as the producer of her records, he said of Hamasaki, "Ayu is a very meticulous worker behind the scenes. A lot of the work she does by herself is more in the producer's arena. I think really we should say 'Produced by [A]yumi [H]amasaki'."In 2022, Matsuura would state that he began to step away from the lead producer role from around 2000, leaving Hamasaki to coordinate production herself. Until her single "M", however, Hamasaki left the task of composing to her staff; as she has explained, "I'm not a professional; I lack even basic knowledge about writing music." However, she started to compose her own melodies after her staff had failed to compose a tune for "M" that appealed to her. Wanting to produce works faithful to her visions, Hamasaki took control of most aspects of her artistry. I Am... is representative of this stage in Hamasaki's career; she directed the production of its songs, videos, and artwork. She began to compose less after I Am...: whereas nearly all of I Am... was her work, only nine of Rainbow fifteen tracks were composed by her. She was even less involved in the composition of subsequent albums, composing two tracks on Memorial Address, three on My Story, and one on (Miss)understood; since Secret, none of the songs on her studio albums have listed her as a composer. With later albums, Hamasaki also began to delegate to her staff tasks she had once handled herself. Hamasaki cites Madonna, soul musicians Babyface and En Vogue, and rock bands Led Zeppelin and Deep Purple as her influences and states that she admires Michelle Branch, Kid Rock, Joan Osborne, Seiko Matsuda, Rie Miyazawa, and Keiko Yamada; these diverse influences have led to the variety of her own music. Hamasaki began commissioning remixes of her songs early in her career, and this practice also influenced the diversity of her music. Found on many of her records, these remixes span different genres of electronic dance music including Eurobeat, house, and trance, as well as acoustic genres such as classical and traditional Chinese music. She has employed Western as well as Japanese musicians; among those she has worked with are Above & Beyond, the Lamoureux Orchestra of France, and traditional Chinese music ensemble Princess China Music Orchestra. Hamasaki has released more than a hundred original songs; through them, she has covered a wide range of musical styles, such as dance, metal, R&B, progressive rock, pop, and classical. She uses different instruments and techniques including piano, orchestra, gospel choirs, guitars, traditional Japanese strings, music boxes, and effects such as yells, claps, and scratching.

Videos and stage 

Hamasaki is often involved in the artistic direction of her music videos. They are often artistic productions through which Hamasaki tries to convey the meaning or feeling of their respective songs. The themes of the videos are varied; she has made "sad and fragile" or "emotional" videos ("Momentum", "Endless Sorrow"), "refreshing" summer videos ("Blue Bird", "Fairyland"), surreal or "scary" videos ("1 Love", "Marionette"), and humorous videos ("Evolution", "Angel's Song", "Beautiful Fighters"). Additionally, many of the videos contain short storylines, some of which use symbolism to convey their respective messages. The video of "Voyage" depicts Hamasaki as a woman in a mental hospital whose previous incarnation was a woman in feudal Japan who was sacrificed to the moon; the video of "Endless Sorrow" features a young boy living in a society where speaking is forbidden by law. In the video for "Free & Easy", Hamasaki portrayed a "twenty-first-century Joan of Arc" to convey her message "freedom cannot be easily obtained; there is a price to pay for it" and to express her opposition to her marrying at the time; the video for "Ourselves" featured masked people destroying "effigies of [Hamasaki's] past" such as photographs and album covers to symbolize destruction and rebirth. Additionally, the videos of "Fairyland", "My Name's Women", "Jewel", "Green", and "Virgin Road" are among the top twenty or so most expensive music videos, making Hamasaki the only non-American artist to hold such a distinction. Hamasaki is also involved in the production and artistic direction of her live performances; they, like her videos, are often lavish productions and use a variety of props, extravagant costumes, and choreographed dances. She has used large video screens, fireworks, simulated rain drops, trick stage floors, and suspended devices.

Public image and legacy
Hamasaki's lyrics and image initially gained a following predominantly among the young Generation X of Asia, often referred to as "the voice of the lost generation". Music critic Tetsu Misaki believed that the juxtaposition of her fashionable appearance and her personal lyrics was one of her most important selling points. The popularity of her music extends beyond Japan, with a sizeable following across Asia. She began moving towards the wider Asian market in 2002, performing at the 2002 MTV Asia awards in Singapore, and later taking her 2007 Tour of Secret concerts to Hong Kong, Taiwan, and Shanghai.

Hamasaki is also noted for the visual aspects of her artistry; she was considered a significant fashion trendsetter in both the 2000s and 2010s, with her influence extending beyond across Asia. While maintaining tight control over her image, Teresa Nieman of The Guardian said that Hamasaki "married accessible, mainstream hits with over-the-top costumes and high-concept videos". Besides her frequent appearances in fashion magazines, such as Vivi, Popteen, and Cawaii!, Hamasaki had often been lauded for her trendy choices in apparels and accessories; Oricon repeatedly named her the "Most Fashionable Female Artist". Among the trends Hamasaki has started is hime-kei (a look inspired by the fashions of 18th century French aristocracy), along with heavily influencing the 2000s kogal subculture. Hamasaki's constantly changing image was apparent not only in her fashion photo shoots and commercial endorsements but also in her record covers, an element she considered essential in conveying her message. 

Although Hamasaki was promoted as a girl-next-door at her debut, she began to already evolve her public image from her second album Loveppears. Its cover, along with the album covers for I Am... and Party Queen, feature Hamasaki in states of partial nudity; something which immediately matured her image, and would later be seen as a running hallmark of the singer's willingness to take risks and be vulnerable in her artistry. After the release of Party Queen in 2011, Hamasaki reinvented her public image by favouring soft, pastel-shaded concepts through the mid-2010s, along with often wearing luxury loungewear. However, she has begun to receive attention in the 2020s as a heralded icon of Y2K fashion, with Hamasaki seen as the face of returning gyaru-kei inspired trends.

As she approaches her 25th anniversary, there has been growing appreciation for Hamasaki's work ethic and dedication to her craft by the public. Atsuo Nagahori of The First Times wrote "Involved in the Japanese pop scene for now over 24 years, she has never stopped touring, never stopped releasing new music, and has never taken a break to recharge her batteries. How many artists can we say we have like that?".

Other activities

Ayuready?
From October 2002 to March 2004, Hamasaki was also the host of her own talk and variety TV show, named Ayuready?, on Fuji Television. The talk show, which aired on Saturday nights from 11:30 to midnight, often featured her performing songs with guests. Among the names who appeared on the program were Goto Maki, Puffy, and Akina Nakamori. To promote the program (and her album Rainbow), Hamasaki opened the Rainbow House restaurant on Shōnan Beach on July 1, 2003, which was open until August 31, 2003. After almost two years, the last episode of Ayuready? aired in March 2004.

Branded products
In 2001, Hamasaki launched her own limited-run fashion brand, MTRLG (Material Girl); the clothes were sold at MTRLG boutiques and at Mise S*clusive stores. In 2002, Hamasaki created Ayupan, a cartoon version of herself that appeared in a line of merchandise (mainly figurines), and in a 2003 animation. For her 2007 tour Tour of Secret, Hamasaki collaborated with Sanrio to create a line of merchandise, "Ayumi Hamasaki x Hello Kitty/", that featured Ayupan and Hello Kitty together. The merchandise included cell phone straps and Lumix cameras decorated with a picture of Hello Kitty behind Hamasaki's "A" logo; the former product was a result of a collaboration with Sanrio and Japanese fashion brand Ash & Diamonds, the latter a collaboration with Sanrio and Panasonic.

Philanthropy
In March 2011, Hamasaki donated 30 million yen to relief efforts for the Tōhoku earthquake and tsunami. In 2021, Hamasaki donated 10 million yen to the Japanese National Center for Global Health and Medicine, receiving the Medal of Honor. 

During the 2022 typhoon aftermath in Shizuoka prefecture, Hamasaki openly criticized the media for not reporting on the disaster thoroughly. Over a period of three days, she organized a donation point and visited Shizuoka to talk to survivors and coordinate resources.

Product endorsements 
Throughout her early career under Avex, Hamasaki promoted products that ranged from electronics (Tu-Ka cell phones and Panasonic) to various snack foods. Among the products she has advertised on television are the Honda Crea scooter, KOSÉ cosmetics, Mister Donut donuts, and Boss coffee. Although Hamasaki initially supported the exploitation of her popularity for commercial purposes, saying that it was "necessary that [she is] viewed as a product", she eventually opposed Avex's decision to market her as a "product rather than a person". Hamasaki has since avoided allowing her image to be used for widespread endorsements.

Personal life
Hamasaki had a seven-year relationship with actor Tomoya Nagase, from 2000 to 2007. The pair had known each other since co-starring a TV drama in 1997, and began a romantic relationship in 2000. It was reported that she had intitiated the break-up due to the couple disagreeing on the subject of marriage, with Nagase rumoured to have been ready to propose to the singer, and Hamasaki not yet being willing to shift focus from her career. Hamasaki would only comment "Since we've been together for 7 years, we aren't suddenly strangers to each other. We keep in touch often. However, after so long we became more like brothers, like family... that kind of relationship." Their relationship was very popular among the general public, with the two still being referred to as "the perfect couple" even over two decades later.

On January 1, 2011, Hamasaki announced her engagement to Austrian actor and model Manuel Schwarz, whom Hamasaki met in August 2010 on the set of her music video for "Virgin Road". On January 2, her office announced that she and Schwarz had married in the United States the day before. However, on January 16, 2012, Hamasaki announced her divorce through her fanclub website. Hamasaki would go on to say that she initially planned to move to the United States, where Schwarz primarily resided; however, her experiences watching the March 2011 Tōhoku disaster footage while being outside of Japan at the time impacted her so greatly, that she felt unable to go through with a permanent relocation. 

On December 13, 2013, it was announced on her official TeamAyu site that Hamasaki had become engaged to an American medical student, whom she had been with since the spring of that year. In the announcement, the singer said "As my partner is an ordinary student, I would be very happy if you could watch over us quietly." On March 3, 2014, the singer announced her second marriage on her fanclub site "TeamAyu". According to her agency, the couple finished their marriage procedure in the United States near the end of February. On February 3, Hamasaki's mother acted as her deputy and submitted the marriage registration in Japan. Two years later on September 11, 2016, Hamasaki announced that she and her husband had separated, with their divorce finalized by the end of that month.

With the release of the non-fiction novel M Aisubeki Hito ga Ite in August 2019, it was made public that Hamasaki had a romantic relationship with her producer, Max Matsuura, from 1998 to 2000. It was written that the reason for their break-up was Hamasaki's unprecedented success, with the singer abandoning her previous expectation of an early retirement, deciding that their relationship should be focused on their shared dream of "Ayumi Hamasaki".

On January 1, 2020, Hamasaki announced on her official TeamAyu site that she had given birth to "a beautiful angel last year", having chosen to keep the pregnancy a secret until that point. On October 2, 2020, Hamasaki announced her second pregnancy through her official TeamAyu site, and in May 2021 confirmed she had given birth to her second child "sometime in spring".

Hearing loss
In January 2008, Hamasaki announced on her blog that an inoperable condition, possibly tinnitus or Ménière's disease, had caused complete deafness in her left ear. She had been diagnosed with the condition in 2006 and that the problem dated to 2000, when she developed an ear infection but continued to perform against the advice of doctors. Despite the setback, Hamasaki stated that she wished to continue singing, and that "as a professional", she wanted to "deliver the best performance for everyone". On May 20, 2017, she wrote that she is also losing hearing in her right ear, and had experienced dizziness and nausea. She vowed to continue performing, writing: "The stage is where I belong. It's the only place I really, truly exist. I don't know anything else."

Discography

 A Song for ×× (1999)
 Loveppears (1999)
 Duty (2000)
 I Am... (2002)
 Rainbow (2002)
 My Story (2004)
 (Miss)understood (2006)
 Secret (2006)
 Guilty (2008)
 Next Level (2009)
 Rock 'n' Roll Circus (2010)
 Love Songs (2010)
 Party Queen (2012)
 Love Again (2013)
 Colours (2014)
 A One (2015)
 Made in Japan (2016)
 Remember You (2023)

Filmography

Concerts

New Year's Eve concerts
 Ayumi Hamasaki Countdown Live 2000–2001 A (2000–2001)
 Ayumi Hamasaki Countdown Live 2001–2002 A (2001–2002)
 Ayumi Hamasaki Countdown Live 2002–2003 A (2002–2003)
 Ayumi Hamasaki Countdown Live 2004–2005 A (2004–2005)
 Ayumi Hamasaki Countdown Live 2005–2006 A (2005–2006)
 Ayumi Hamasaki Best of Countdown Live 2006–2007 A (2006–2007)
 Ayumi Hamasaki Countdown Live 2007–2008 Anniversary (2007–2008)
 Ayumi Hamasaki Premium Countdown Live 2008–2009 A (2008–2009)
 Ayumi Hamasaki Countdown Live 2009–2010 A: Future Classics (2009–2010)
 Ayumi Hamasaki Countdown Live 2010–2011 A: Do It Again (2010–2011)
 Ayumi Hamasaki Countdown Live 2011–2012 A: Hotel Love Songs (2011–2012)
 Ayumi Hamasaki Countdown Live 2012–2013 A: Wake Up (2012–2013)
 Ayumi Hamasaki Countdown Live 2013-2014 A (2013–2014)
 Ayumi Hamasaki Countdown Live 2014–2015 A: Cirque de Minuit (2014–2015)
 Ayumi Hamasaki Countdown Live 2015–2016 A: Made In Tokyo (2015–2016)
 Ayumi Hamasaki Countdown Live 2016–2017 A: Just The Beginning 20 (2016–2017)
 Ayumi Hamasaki Countdown Live 2018–2019 A: Trouble (2018–2019)
 Ayumi Hamasaki Countdown Live 2019–2020: Promised Land A (2019–2020)
 Ayumi Hamasaki Countdown Live 2021–2022 A: 23rd Monster (2021–2022)
 Ayumi Hamasaki Countdown Live 2022–2023 A: Remember You (2022 - 2023)

Concert tours

 Ayumi Hamasaki Concert Tour 2000 Vol.1 (2000)
 Ayumi Hamasaki Concert Tour 2000 Vol.2 (2000)
 Ayumi Hamasaki Dome Tour 2001 A (2001)
 Ayumi Hamasaki Arena Tour 2002 A (2002)
 Ayumi Hamasaki Stadium Tour 2002 A (2002)
 Limited Team Ayu Live Tour (2003)
 Ayumi Hamasaki A Museum: 30th Single Collection Live (2003)
 Ayumi Hamasaki Arena Tour 2003–2004 A (2003–2004)
 Ayumi Hamasaki Arena Tour 2005 A: My Story (2005)
 Ayumi Hamasaki Arena Tour 2006 A: (Miss)understood (2006)
 Ayumi Hamasaki Asia Tour 2007 A: Tour of Secret (2007)
 Ayumi Hamasaki Asia Tour 2008: 10th Anniversary (2008)
 Ayumi Hamasaki Arena Tour 2009 A: Next Level (2009)
 Ayumi Hamasaki Rock 'n' Roll Circus Tour Final: 7 Days Special (2010)
 Ayumi Hamasaki Power of Music 2011 A (2011)
 Ayumi Hamasaki Arena Tour 2012 A: Hotel Love Songs (2012)
 Ayumi Hamasaki 15th Anniversary Tour: A Best Live (2013)
 Ayumi Hamasaki Premium Showcase: Feel the Love (2014)
 Ayumi Hamasaki Arena Tour 2015 A: Cirque de Minuit – The Final (2015)
 Team Ayu Limited Live Tour 2015 (2015)
 Ayumi Hamasaki Arena Tour 2016 A: Made In Japan (2016)
 Team Ayu Limited Live Tour 2016 (2016)
 Ayumi Hamasaki Just the Beginning 20 Tour 2017 (2017–2018)
 Ayumi Hamasaki Arena Tour 2018: Power of Music 20th Anniversary (2018)
 Ayumi Hamasaki Trouble Tour 2018–2019 A (2018-2019)
 Ayumi Hamasaki 21st Anniversary: Power of A^3 (2019)
 Ayumi Hamasaki Trouble Tour 2019 A: Misunderstood (2019)
 Ayumi Hamasaki Premium Limited Live A: Natsu no Trouble (2020)
 Ayumi Hamasaki Trouble Tour 2020 A: Saigo no Trouble – Final (2020)
 Ayumi Hamasaki Music for Life: Return (2021)
 Ayumi Hamasaki Asia Tour 2021–2022 A: 23rd Monster (2021–2022)

Video games/software 
Visual Mix Ayumi Hamasaki Dome Tour 2001 (PlayStation 2)
A-TYPE ayumi hamasaki touch typing software (March 29, 2002, e frontier, Windows)

Awards

See also

List of awards received by Ayumi Hamasaki
List of best-selling music artists
List of best-selling music artists in Japan
List of J-pop artists

Footnotes

References

Further reading

External links

  

 
1978 births
20th-century Japanese actresses
20th-century Japanese businesswomen
20th-century Japanese businesspeople
20th-century Japanese composers
20th-century Japanese women singers
20th-century women composers
21st-century Japanese actresses
21st-century Japanese businesswomen
21st-century Japanese businesspeople
21st-century Japanese composers
21st-century Japanese women singers
21st-century women composers
Avex Trax artists
Deaf actresses
Deaf musicians
Japanese deaf people
Japanese dance musicians
Japanese electronic musicians
Japanese female dancers
Japanese female models
Japanese film actresses
Japanese hip hop musicians
Japanese female idols
Japanese record producers
Japanese television actresses
Japanese trance musicians
Japanese voice actresses
Japanese women composers
Japanese women in electronic music
Japanese women pop singers
Japanese women record producers
Japanese women rock singers
Japanese women singer-songwriters
Living people
Musicians from Fukuoka Prefecture
Nippon Columbia artists
People from Fukuoka
Spokespersons
World Music Awards winners